Henry J. Downes (August 3, 1910 – February 5, 1970) was an American football player and coach.

Playing career
An All-American at Boston College, his football playing career ended in 1931 due to an injury suffered against Holy Cross. In 1933, he pitched for Barnstable in the Cape Cod Baseball League.

Coaching career
In 1935, Downes became Boston College's head coach after Dinny McNamara resigned due to illness after four games. At the age of 25, he became one of the youngest head coaches in the history of college football. After going 3–2 in the remaining five games, he was replaced the next season by Gil Dobie and demoted to assistant coach. 

In 1937, Downes became head football coach at Quincy High School in Quincy, Massachusetts. From 1938 until his death in 1970, he was head coach at Brookline High School.

Legacy
The football field at Brookline High was named in honor of him, however in 2006 the name was changed to the Kraft Family Athletic Facility at Harry Downes Field after New England Patriots owner and BHS alumnus Robert Kraft donated $400,000 toward the renovation of the field and encouraged the National Football League to donate an additional $200,000 to the project.

Head coaching record

College

Notes

References

1910 births
1970 deaths
American football centers
Boston College Eagles football coaches
Boston College Eagles football players
Cape Cod Baseball League players (pre-modern era)
High school football coaches in Massachusetts
Hyannis Harbor Hawks players
Sportspeople from Brookline, Massachusetts
Players of American football from Massachusetts